Anam-dong is a dong, neighbourhood of Seongbuk-gu in Seoul, South Korea.

Notable places
Korea University
Gaeunsa (개운사 開運寺)
Botasa (보타사 普陀寺)

See also 
Administrative divisions of South Korea

References

External links
 Seongbuk-gu Official site in English
 Map of Seongbuk-gu
 Seongbuk-gu Official website
 Anam-dong Resident office

Neighbourhoods of Seongbuk District